The white-clasper catshark (Parmaturus albipenis) is a recently described deepwater catshark, known only from a single specimen collected from northern New Caledonia at a depth of 688–732 m. The only known specimen, an adult male, measured a total of 41.5 cm in length.

References 

white-clasper catshark
Fish of New Caledonia
white-clasper catshark